Prague Film School is a private film school in the Czech Republic, providing training in the fields of cinematography, directing, screenwriting, editing and acting for film.

History 
Prague Film School was founded to provide international students with an alternative to more expensive film programs in the United States and more theory-driven film academies in Europe, with the idea of offering one-year training courses to aspiring filmmakers. Originally a narrative film course, Prague Film School expanded in 2000, introducing documentary and acting for film programs in later years and both longer and shorter courses. Today the school accepts approximately 200 students per year.

Departments and programs 
Prague Film School offers full-time studies in Narrative Film-making, Documentary Film-making, and Acting for Film.

Notable alumni 
Levi Meaden (born 1987), Canadian actor (Aftermath, The Killing)
Raam Reddy, Indian film director (Thithi)
Rachel House (born 1971), New Zealand actress (Whale Rider, Moana)

References

External links

Drama schools in the Czech Republic
Film schools in the Czech Republic